New Formosa Band is a Taiwanese pop music ensemble. Its members include Bobby Chen and Ayugo Huang. The group was established in 1992 and are important musicians in the genres of Hakka and New Taiwanese Song. They released several albums in the 1990s which blended traditional Taiwanese folk music with pop elements. The group sang in both the traditional style of Taiwanese song (influenced by Japanese enka) and in a more modern pop style, as well as employing the dialect of the Hakka people. The group is also active supporters of politicians of Hakka descent.

History 
The first album released by the band in 1992, "The Passionate Man", received attention for having both Hakka and Chinese vocals. In 2012, New Formosa Band won the 23rd Golden Melody Award for Best Group for their song "Eight Feet Open".

References

Taiwanese boy bands
1992 establishments in Taiwan
Musical groups established in 1992